Carlo Saraudi (4 February 1899 – 22 November 1973) was an Italian boxer. He competed at the 1924 Summer Olympics in the light heavyweight division. He lost the semifinal to Harry Mitchell, but did not compete for the bronze medal because the Italian Boxing Federation withdrew its athletes in a protest against the tournaments earlier referee decisions; thus Saraudi ended up in the fourth place.

In 1926–1932 he fought five bouts as a professional, winning three, losing one and drawing one. He later trained his sons Giulio and Vittorio, who both became elite light-heavyweight boxers.

References

External links
Report on Italian Olympic boxers 

1899 births
1973 deaths
People from Civitavecchia
Light-heavyweight boxers
Olympic boxers of Italy
Boxers at the 1924 Summer Olympics
Italian male boxers
Sportspeople from the Metropolitan City of Rome Capital
20th-century Italian people